Verin Jrashen is a neighbourhood in Yerevan, Armenia.

References

Populated places in Yerevan